The Kenya Anti-Corruption Authority (KACA) of Kenya was established in 1997 after the amendment of the Prevention of Corruption Act (Cap 65, LOK) in early 1997. The first director was John Harun Mwau who was appointed in December 1997.  In April 2003, it was replaced by the Kenya Anti-Corruption Commission (KACC) which was subsequently replaced by the Ethics and Anti-Corruption Commission (EACC).

See also
 Corruption in Kenya
 Kenya Anti-Corruption Commission
 Ethics and Anti-Corruption Commission

References

External links 
 - Ethics and Anti-Corruption Commission

Politics of Kenya
Government agencies of Kenya
2012 in Kenya
Legal history of Kenya
Kenya articles by importance
Corruption in Kenya
Anti-corruption agencies